Nephilengys malabarensis is an araneid spider.

The legs and palp are annulated yellow and black.

N. malabarensis is being preyed upon by the spider-eating jumping spider Portia.

Name
The species name malabarensis refers to the Malabar coast of southern India, where it was first found.

Distribution
N. malabarensis occurs in South, South-East and East Asia from India and Sri Lanka to the Philippines, north to Yunnan, China, north-east to Saga and Kompira, Japan and east to Ambon Island of Indonesia. It is common at human dwellings and less common in rainforest. The Niah population inhabits cave entrances.

References

Further reading

Araneidae
Spiders of Asia
Spiders described in 1842